The Buckingham is a historic apartment building located at Indianapolis, Indiana. It was built in 1909–1910, and is a three-story, "U"-shaped, Tudor Revival style brown-red brick building with limestone trim.  It features four-sided turrets framing the three-bay entrance facade with loggia and oriel windows.

It was listed on the U.S. National Register of Historic Places in 1992.

References

Residential buildings on the National Register of Historic Places in Indiana
Tudor Revival architecture in Indiana
Residential buildings completed in 1910
Residential buildings in Indianapolis
National Register of Historic Places in Indianapolis